The 2001–02 Egyptian Super Cup was the first Egyptian Super Cup, an annual football match contested by the winners of the previous season's Egyptian Premier League and Egypt Cup competitions, Al Ahly (Egypt Cup champions ) withdrew from participating, so Ghazl El Mahalla (Egypt cup runner-up) participated instead.
Zamalek won the game 2–1 after extra time.

Match details

References
 http://www.angelfire.com/ak/EgyptianSports/ZamalekinEgyptSuperCup.html#2000/2001
 http://www.footballdatabase.eu/football.competition.super-cup.egypte.2001-2002...en.html
 https://www.youtube.com/watch?v=YugFTCUdhug

Egyptian Super Cup
Cup
ESC
ESC